Karanovac is a village in the municipality of Varvarin, Serbia. According to the 2011 census, the village has a population of 290 inhabitants.

Population

References

Populated places in Rasina District